Giovanni Viola (20 June 1926 – 7 July 2008) was an Italian footballer who played as a goalkeeper. Although he represented several Italian clubs throughout his career, he is mostly remembered for his successful stint with Juventus, where he won three Serie A titles. At international level, he represented the Italy national football team at the 1954 FIFA World Cup.

Club career
During his club career, Viola played for Italian side Juventus from 1945 to 1958. He was brought in as a replacement for Lucidio Sentimenti (IV), and made 246 appearances for the Turin club, winning the Scudetto on three occasions: in 1950, 1952 and 1958. He also played for Carrarese, Como, Lucchese, and Brescia.

International career
At international level, Viola also played 11 matches for the Italy between 1954 and 1956. He made his debut at the 1954 FIFA World Cup, in the 4–1 first round play-off defeat of Switzerland.

Style of play
Regarded as one of the best and most consistent Italian shot-stoppers of his generation, and as one of Juventus's greatest goalkeepers of all-time, Viola was an efficient and reliable keeper, who was known in particular for his composure in goal, although he also had the ability to produce acrobatic saves when necessary due to his agility and athleticism.

Honours
Juventus
Serie A: 1949–50, 1951–52 and 1957–58

References

1926 births
2008 deaths
1954 FIFA World Cup players
S.S.D. Lucchese 1905 players
Brescia Calcio players
Como 1907 players
Association football goalkeepers
Italian footballers
Italy international footballers
Juventus F.C. players
Footballers from Piedmont
Serie A players
People from San Benigno Canavese
Sportspeople from the Metropolitan City of Turin